Nepenthes bongso  is a tropical pitcher plant endemic to Sumatra, where it has an altitudinal distribution of 1000–2700 m above sea level. The specific epithet bongso refers to the Indonesian legend of Putri Bungsu (literally "youngest daughter"), the spirit guardian of Mount Marapi.

The species was formally described by Pieter Willem Korthals in his 1839 monograph, "Over het geslacht Nepenthes".

Nepenthes carunculata is considered a heterotypic synonym of N. bongso by most authorities. The infraspecific taxon Nepenthes carunculata var. robusta was described in 1994 by Joachim Nerz and Andreas Wistuba. It is an extreme variety of this taxon with a large, flared peristome.

In his Carnivorous Plant Database, taxonomist Jan Schlauer treats N. junghuhnii (sensu Macfarlane) as a possible synonym of N. bongso.

Related species

Natural hybrids

The following natural hybrids involving N. bongso have been recorded.

N. bongso × N. gymnamphora
N. bongso × N. singalana
N. bongso × N. talangensis

In his 1928 monograph "The Nepenthaceae of the Netherlands Indies", B. H. Danser mentioned what he thought was the hybrid N. bongso × N. pectinata; however, this plant material is now known to represent N. densiflora, a species described by Danser 12 years later.

Notes

a.Nepenthes carunculata is pronounced . The specific epithet is derived from the Latin word caruncula, a diminutive of caro (flesh), and refers to the fleshy seed appendages of this taxon.

References

Further reading

 Bauer, U., C.J. Clemente, T. Renner & W. Federle 2012. Form follows function: morphological diversification and alternative trapping strategies in carnivorous Nepenthes pitcher plants. Journal of Evolutionary Biology 25(1): 90–102. 
  Blume, C.L. 1852. Ord. Nepenthaceae. In: Museum Botanicum Lugduno-Batavum, sive stirpium exoticarum novarum vel minus cognitarum ex vivis aut siccis brevis expositio. Tom. II. Nr. 1. E.J. Brill, Lugduni-Batavorum. pp. 5–10.
 Clarke, C.M. 2006. Introduction. In: Danser, B.H. The Nepenthaceae of the Netherlands Indies. Natural History Publications (Borneo), Kota Kinabalu. pp. 1–15.
 Clarke, C. & C.C. Lee 2012. A revision of Nepenthes (Nepenthaceae) from Gunung Tahan, Peninsular Malaysia. Gardens' Bulletin Singapore 64(1): 33–49.
 Hernawati & P. Akhriadi 2006. A Field Guide to the Nepenthes of Sumatra. PILI-NGO Movement, Bogor.
 Kato, M., M. Hotta, R. Tamin & T. Itino 1993. Inter- and intra-specific variation in prey assemblages and inhabitant communities in Nepenthes pitchers in Sumatra. Tropical Zoology 6(1): 11–25. Abstract 
 Kurata, S. 1973. Nepenthes from Borneo, Singapore and Sumatra. The Gardens' Bulletin Singapore 26(2): 227–232.
 Macfarlane, J.M. 1914. Family XCVI. Nepenthaceæ. [pp. 279–288] In: J.S. Gamble. Materials for a flora of the Malayan Peninsula, No. 24. Journal & Proceedings of the Asiatic Society of Bengal 75(3): 279–391.
  Mansur, M. 2001. Koleksi Nepenthes di Herbarium Bogoriense: prospeknya sebagai tanaman hias. In: Prosiding Seminar Hari Cinta Puspa dan Satwa Nasional. Lembaga Ilmu Pengetahuan Indonesia, Bogor. pp. 244–253. 
 Meimberg, H., A. Wistuba, P. Dittrich & G. Heubl 2001. Molecular phylogeny of Nepenthaceae based on cladistic analysis of plastid trnK intron sequence data. Plant Biology 3(2): 164–175. 
  Meimberg, H. 2002. Molekular-systematische Untersuchungen an den Familien Nepenthaceae und Ancistrocladaceae sowie verwandter Taxa aus der Unterklasse Caryophyllidae s. l.. Ph.D. thesis, Ludwig Maximilian University of Munich, Munich. 
 Meimberg, H. & G. Heubl 2006. Introduction of a nuclear marker for phylogenetic analysis of Nepenthaceae. Plant Biology 8(6): 831–840. 
  Puspitaningtyas, D.M. & H. Wawangningrum 2007. Keanekaragaman Nepenthes di Suaka Alam Sulasih Talang - Sumatera Barat. [Nepenthes diversity in Sulasih Talang Nature Reserve - West Sumatra.] Biodiversitas 8(2): 152–156.  Cover 
 Redwood, G.N. & J.C. Bowling 1990. Micropropagation of Nepenthes species. Botanic Gardens Micropropagation News 1(2): 19–20.
 Ridley, H.N. 1915. Nepenthaceæ. [pp. 168–169] In: XIII. The botany of Gunong Tahan, Pahang. Journal of the Federated Malay States Museums 6: 127–202.
 Shivas, R.G. 1984. Three Nepenthes from the Padang Highlands. Carnivorous Plant Newsletter 13(1): 10–15.
  Syamsuardi & R. Tamin 1994. Kajian kekerabatan jenis-jenis Nepenthes di Sumatera Barat. Project report, Andalas University, Padang. Abstract 
  Syamsuardi 1995. Klasifikasi numerik kantong semar (Nepenthes) di Sumatera Barat. [Numerical classification of pitcher plants (Nepenthes) in West Sumatra.] Journal Matematika dan Pengetahuan Alam 4(1): 48–57. Abstract

External links

Photographs of N. bongso at the Carnivorous Plant Photofinder

bongso
Endemic flora of Sumatra
Carnivorous plants of Asia
Plants described in 1839